Chasen Hines (born April 3, 2000) is an American football guard for the New England Patriots of the National Football League (NFL). He played college football at LSU.

Early career
Hines played baseball in his youth. He played until he was a junior in high school. However, he eventually gained a love for football. He played football for his last two years at Marshall High School. He was a four-star recruit defensive tackle. After his senior season, he chose to play for the LSU Tigers and he was switched from a defensive tackle to an offensive guard. He played for them all four years, playing in 35 games and starting in 17 games.

Professional career
Hines was selected by the New England Patriots with the 210th pick in the sixth round of the 2022 NFL Draft. He was placed on injured reserve on October 29, 2022.

References

External links
 New England Patriots bio
LSU Tigers bio

2000 births
Living people
People from Marshall, Texas
Players of American football from Texas
American football offensive guards
LSU Tigers football players
New England Patriots players